4N may refer to:
4th parallel north latitude
Air North's IATA code
4N, the production code for the 1976 Doctor Who serial The Hand of Fear
4N, A special TSMC semiconductor node built specifically for Nvidia in their Geforce 40 Series of graphics cards

See also
Hückel's rule, 4n + 2 rule
Singly even number, a number of the form 4n + 2
A-4N, a model of Douglas A-4 Skyhawk
AD-4N, a model of Douglas A-1 Skyraider
RQ-4N, a model of Northrop Grumman RQ-4 Global Hawk
F-4N Phantom II, see List of McDonnell Douglas F-4 Phantom II variants
F7F-4N, a model of Grumman F7F Tigercat
F4N, a model of Vought F4U Corsair
N4 (disambiguation)